Miami Cemetery may refer to:

Miami City Cemetery
Miami Cemetery (Corwin, Ohio)